Archibald Ernest Sexton GM (3 April 1908 – 11 July 1957) was an English professional boxer who began his career at featherweight in 1925 and finished as a middleweight in 1936. He had at least 222 professional contests, including one for the British middleweight title in 1933, where he lost by a tenth round technical knockout to Jock McAvoy.

Biography
Sexton was born at Bethnal Green. He took part in the world's first televised boxing match, a six-round exhibition against Laurie Raiteri in London on 22 August 1933. The loss of the sight of his left eye – which occurred during a boxing match – forced him to retire from boxing in 1936, although he later worked as a BBBofC referee. During the Second World War he served as a Police War Reserve Constable, and in 1944 he was awarded the George Medal for his part in rescuing two men and a woman trapped in an air-raid shelter underneath Moorfields Eye Hospital in London.

He died in New Zealand on 11 July 1957 from a stroke, aged 49.

Family
His son Dave had success in football, managing Chelsea and Manchester United. 
He also had another son Terence Sexton .
His brother James, another professional boxer, fought under the alias Jim Blake.
His great granddaughter through marriage is professional undefeated female boxer Ramla Ali

References
Notes

Bibliography
https://web.archive.org/web/20110201033119/http://nipperpatdaly.co.uk/archiesexton.html

External links
  (record currently incomplete)

1908 births
1957 deaths
Recipients of the George Medal
English male boxers
Featherweight boxers
Lightweight boxers
Welterweight boxers
Middleweight boxers
People from Bethnal Green
Date of death unknown
Boxers from Greater London
War Reserve officers of the Metropolitan Police